Garab Kuchek (also Romanized as Garāb Kūcheḵ; also known as Garāb-e ‘Olyā and Garāb) is a village in Tarhan-e Sharqi Rural District, Tarhan District, Kuhdasht County, Lorestan Province, Iran. At the 2006 census, its population was 606, in 119 families.

References 

Towns and villages in Kuhdasht County